Clark Aldrich is an American author and practitioner in the field of educational simulations and serious games for education and professional skills.

Beginning in 1999, he published research outlining the failure of formal education approaches to teaching leadership, innovation, and other strategic skills. He advocated for interactive experiences, borrowing techniques from current computer games as media to fill these gaps. He argues that computer games represent new "post-linear" models for representing content and that new computer game genres will have to be created for learning as well as entertainment. His research and simulation design works, which he conducted outside of the influence and prescription of academic and grant-giving institutions, resulted in a series of articles, speeches and 5 books.

Background

Childhood and education
Aldrich grew up in Concord, Massachusetts, and graduated from Fenn School and Lawrence Academy. He spent eight summers at the Chewonki Foundation, including four as a counselor under the mentorship of Director Tim Ellis. He received his Bachelor's degree in Cognitive Science from Brown University in 1989.

Career
Aldrich first worked at Xerox as the speech writer for Executive Vice President Wayland Hicks. Aldrich became the Governor’s appointee to the Joint Committee on Educational Technology and served in this role from 1996–2000 while at Xerox. He then moved to Gartner, where he launched their e-learning coverage and began his formal writing and analysis about the education. Later on, he left Gartner to begin hands-on work in designing and building simulations himself, where he also increased his external writing about the industry through books, columns, and articles.

Aldrich went on to found the company SimuLearn, which produces training simulations that help corporations teach leadership, responsibility, and other skills within a corporate setting. The first product that was released by the company was titled Virtual Leader, and it required the player to conduct a series of business meetings while still juggling the interpersonal relationships of the employees and customers during business hours. His simulations have earned numerous industry awards, including "Best Product of the Year" in 2004 by the American Society of Training And Development/Training Media Review. He is also the lead designer for several educational simulations, including SimuLearn's Virtual Leader, which won "Best Online Training Product of the Year" in 2004 by Training Media Review and the American Society for Training and Development's T+D Magazine - the first game-like product to win.

Aldrich's work is part of the conversation about the impact of simulations and serious games on the direction of 21st-century learning.

Books

References

Further reading

External links
 Aldrich Repository of Simulations and Serious Games
 Aldrich Unschooling Rules Blog

American education writers
1967 births
Living people